Amparanirappel is a place near Palai in Kottayam district of Kerala, India.

Location
It is located on the outskirts of Bharananganam, a renowned pilgrimage center. Nearby towns are Palai and Erattupetta.

Economy
Major plantation in this area is rubber. The Meenachil river flows along one side of Amparanirappel. It is the home land of  First Engineering & Technology monthly in Malayalam"Engineers World". Amparanirappel is located in Poonjar assembly constituency seat. Since Thidanadu panchayat is a part of Pathanamthitta Parliament seat, the place belongs to that constituency.

Nearby Places of Interest 
 Bharananganam
 Palai
 Vagamon

Home Stays in the area 
Planters Home Stay

References

Villages in Kottayam district